Montreal Royals was a Canadian football team in Interprovincial Rugby Football Union. The team played in the 1939 season.

Notable players
 Bill Davies

IRFU season-by-season

References
CFL DB - Montreal Royals

Interprovincial Rugby Football Union teams
Defunct Canadian football teams
Ind